Garland is a small community located in Kings County, Nova Scotia, Canada.

References
  Garland on Destination Nova Scotia

Communities in Kings County, Nova Scotia
General Service Areas in Nova Scotia